Lucius the Ascetic was a 5th-century Syrian Christian abbot at Enaton. He was one of the Desert Fathers. He was a companion of Longinus.

References

5th-century births
5th-century deaths
Christian abbots
Eastern Catholic saints
Coptic Orthodox saints
Desert Fathers